Florițoaia Veche is a commune in Ungheni District, Moldova. It is composed of three villages: Florițoaia Nouă, Florițoaia Veche and Grozasca.

West of Florițoaia Veche, there is a 245 metres tall guyed mast for FM-/TV-broadcasting.

References

Communes of Ungheni District